Schahina Gambir (born 6 June 1991) is a German politician of Alliance 90/The Greens who has been serving as a member of the Bundestag since the 2021 elections, representing the Minden-Lübbecke I district.

Political career
In parliament, Gambir has been a member of the Committee on Family Affairs, Senior Citizens, Women and Youth. Since 2022, she has been part of a study commission set up to investigate the entire period of German involvement in Afghanistan from 2001 to 2021 and to draw lessons for  foreign and security policy in future.

References 

Living people
1991 births
People from Kabul
Afghan emigrants to Germany
German people of Afghan descent
Naturalized citizens of Germany
21st-century German politicians
21st-century German women politicians
Members of the Bundestag for Alliance 90/The Greens
Members of the Bundestag 2021–2025
Female members of the Bundestag